Kenneth Moody Whitlow (November 30, 1917 – November 12, 1969) was an American football center.

Whitlow was born in Wichita Falls, Texas in 1917 and attended Wichita Falls High School. He played college football for Rice.  He was selected by the Associated Press as the first-team center on the 1940 All-Southwest Conference football team.

He played professional football in the All-America Football Conference for the Miami Seahawks in 1946.  He appeared in a total of 13 professional games, seven of them as a starter. 

He died in 1969 in Houston.

References

1917 births
1969 deaths
American football centers
Miami Seahawks players
Rice Owls football players
Players of American football from Texas
People from Wichita Falls, Texas